Yadoga is a village in Uttar kannada district in the state of Karnataka, India.

Telephone Code / Std Code: 08284

Pin Code : 581329

Post Office Name : Haliyal

Overview of Yadoga 
Yadoga is a place near Haliyal with a high Maratha population. The Pin code is 581329 and the postal head office is Haliyal. Dharwad, Hubli, Dandeli, and Belgaum are nearby cities.

How To Reach Yadoga

By Rail 
Tavargatti Rail Way Station (near to Alnavar), Alnavar Junction Rail Way Station (near to Alnavar) are the Rail way stations reachable from nearby towns.

By Road 
Haliyal, Dandeli, Alnavar are nearby by towns to Yadoga having road connectivity to Yadoga

Schools near Yadoga 
 Shri Shivaji pre-university college, Haliyal
 Government First grade college,  Haliyal
 Government primary School, Yadoga
 Government High School, Yadoga, Address: Government High School Yadoga pin no 581329''

VDIT Civil Engineering Department;. BCA College 
Haliyal; Karnataka 581329; India 
1.9 km distance

Civil Department 
Haliyal; Karnataka 581329; India 
1.9 km

VDRIT 
Udyog Vidya Nagar; Dandeli Road; Haliyal; Karnataka 581329; India 
2.0 km

K.L.S Vishwanathrao Deshpande Rural Institute of Technology 
Dandeli Road; Udyog Vidya Nagar; Haliyal; Karnataka 581329; India 
2.1 km

Government Primary School No. 3 
Haliyal; Karnataka 581329; India 
2.0 km

Swami Vivekanand School 
Haliyal; Karnataka 581329; India 
2.2 km

Swamy Vivekanand English Medium School 
Haliyal; Karnataka 581329; India 
2.2 km

Vivekananda School 
Haliyal; Karnataka 581329; India 
2.2 km

VVD School of Excellence 
Haliyal; Karnataka 581329; India 
2.3 km

Health Centers near Yadoga 
 Government Hospital, Yadoga

 Government Hospital, Haliyal
 Alnavar, Medical Officer Primary Health Center, Alnavar

Makandar Complex 
Makandar Complex Dhalayat Galli; New Bus Stand Rd; Moti Talab; Haliyal; Karnataka 581329; India

Dr Oshimath Clinic 
Haliyal; Karnataka 581329; India

Petrol Bunks in Yadoga,Haliyal 
 SH 93; Haliyal; Karnataka 581329; India 

 SH 28; Haliyal; Karnataka 581329; India

Hindustan Petroleum 

 Haliyal; Uttara Kannada; SH-93; Khanapura Haliyal Yellapura Road; Uttara Kannada; Uttara Kannada; Karnataka 581329; India

HP Petrol Pump 
 HPCL Dealer;Near Modern Rice Mill; Haliyal-Belgaum Rd; Haliyal; Karnataka 581329; India

Electronic Shops in Yadoga,Haliyal

S N computers 
Azad Rd; Haliyal; Karnataka 581329; India 
2.2 km

Bankapur Electricals 
Haliyal; Karnataka 581329; India 
2.8 km

Jagadamba Auto Gyareje And Service 
Haliyal-Yallapur Rd; Haliyal; Karnataka 581329; India 
2.9 km

Super Markets in Yadoga,Haliyal

Gangadhar Stores 
Alnavar; Karnataka 581103; India 
12.5 km

Alnavar Big Market 
Alnavar; Karnataka 581103; India 
12.6 km

Local Parks in Yadoga,Haliyal

Kadamba Fort 
Timmapura - Havagi Rd; Haliyal; Karnataka 581329; India 
1.9 km

Kote Nisarga Udyana Park 
Uttara Kannada; Karnataka 581329; India 
1.9 km

Urban Circle 
; Haliyal; Karnataka 581329; India 
2.8 km

Police Stations near Yadoga,Haliyal

Police Station 
Haliyal; Karnataka 581329; India 
3.4 km

Police Station 
3213/B; SH 93; Karnataka 581103; India

Bhagwati Police Station 
Uttara Kannada; Karnataka 581363; India 
22.3 km

Government Offices near Yadoga,Haliyal

PWD Office 
Haliyal; Karnataka 581329; India 
3.3 km

Irrigation Department Office 
Haliyal; Karnataka 581329; India 
3.3 km

Taluka Panchayat Office 
Haliyal; Karnataka 581329; India 
3.3 km About Yadoga & History

Near Cities

Dharwad  35 km 
Hubli  48 km 

Belgaum  70 km 
Near By Taluks

Haliyal  5 km 
Supa  31 km 

Dharwad  35 km near

Nearby Air Ports

Hubli Airport  41 km 

Nearby Tourist Places
near  

Karwar 96 km 
Yana 94 km

2. Shivaji bobli, s/o: parashuram bobli, yadoga 

Villages in Belagavi district